PTC India Limited, formerly Power Trading Corporation of India Limited, is an Indian company that provides power trading solutions, cross border power trading, and consultancy services. Headquartered in New Delhi, India, the company also has operations in Nepal, Bhutan, and Bangladesh. PTC India's subsidiaries PTC India Financial Services Limited and PTC Energy Limited provide financial assistance for companies in the power sector and run renewable energy projects respectively.

The investment decisions of PTC management was criticized as "value destructive" by some institutional investors in August 2018.

As of January 2019, PTC Energy managed a renewable energy portfolio of around 290 megawatts of wind assets across Madhya Pradesh, Karnataka and Andhra Pradesh.

Dr. Rajib Kumar Mishra has been delegated the additional charge of Chairman & Managing Director, PTC India Ltd. w.e.f. 6th November 2021 by PTC Board.

References

Indian companies established in 1999
Electric power companies of India
Companies based in New Delhi
Companies listed on the National Stock Exchange of India
Companies listed on the Bombay Stock Exchange